Cosmoderes is a genus of true weevils in the subfamily Scolytinae.

References 

 Ratio, descriptio, emendatio eorum Tomicinorum qui sunt Dr. medic. W Eichhoff, Chapuisi et autoris ipsius collectionibus et quos …, 1878

External links 

 
 Cosmoderes at insectoid.info

Curculionidae genera
Scolytinae